The Spear is a 1978 novel by British author James Herbert dealing with Nazi occultism and the Holy Lance.

Plot summary
The book deals with a neo-Nazi cult in Britain and an international conspiracy which includes a right-wing US general and a sinister arms dealer, and their obsession with resurrecting Heinrich Himmler through the occult.

Reception
Ramsey Campbell praised the novel, saying "The Spear scores as a thriller, especially in its set pieces".

Court case
In an earlier version of The Holy Blood and the Holy Grail/The Da Vinci Code lawsuit, Trevor Ravenscroft sued James Herbert claiming the novel infringed on his 1973 non-fiction book The Spear of Destiny. Herbert declined to pay Ravenscroft damages and eventually removed the offending content.

See also

Nazi occultism

References

1978 British novels
Novels about neo-Nazism
Novels involved in plagiarism controversies
Novels by James Herbert
New English Library books